Julius Caesar Cantelmi (born 1457) was a Roman Catholic prelate who served as Bishop of Montepeloso (1482–1491).

Biography
Julius Caesar Cantelmi was born in 1457.
On 20 March 1482, he was appointed during the papacy of Pope Sixtus IV as Bishop of Montepeloso.
He served as Bishop of Montepeloso until his resignation in 1491.

References

External links and additional sources
  (Chronology of Bishops) 
  (Chronology of Bishops) 

15th-century Italian Roman Catholic bishops
Bishops appointed by Pope Sixtus IV
1457 births